This is a list of Hindu members of the United States Congress.

, three practicing Hindus have been elected to Congress, the first being Tulsi Gabbard in 2013. In total, eight members of Congress have been either practicing Hindus or born into Hindu families but adhering to other religions. Two practicing Hindus currently serve in the United States House of Representatives.

Senate

No Hindu has ever served in the United States Senate. Kamala Harris (D) of California, a former senator who is currently the Vice President, was raised by a Hindu mother but identifies as a Baptist.

House of Representatives

In addition to the representatives below, four representatives, Bobby Jindal (R) of Louisiana, a former representative who converted to Christianity in high school and identifies as a Catholic, Ami Bera (D) of California, who identifies as a Unitarian Universalist, Pramila Jayapal (D) of Washington, whose religious affiliation is unknown, and Shri Thanedar (D) of Michigan, who identifies as a Protestant, all grew up in a Hindu household but adhere to other religions.

See also
 List of Buddhist members of the United States Congress
 List of Jewish members of the United States Congress
 List of Mormon members of the United States Congress
 List of Muslim members of the United States Congress
 List of Quaker members of the United States Congress
 List of Asian Americans and Pacific Islands Americans in the United States Congress

References

Lists of members of the United States Congress
American Hindus